Rose Hill Platform served workmen in the Rose Hill area of Harrington in the former county of Cumberland, England, which is now part of Cumbria.

The halt was on the Harrington and Lowca Light Railway where it connected with the Cleator & Workington Junction Railway (CWJR) a short distance north of Copperas Hill and south of Harrington Village. Public passenger trains ran to these last two only.

There is no evidence that any advertised public service ever called at the halt.

A workmen's service ran north from Lowca from April 1912. It appears to have called at Rose Hill Platform, but there is considerable doubt if there was even a physical platform in place.

Details of the workmen's service are sketchy. A letter from Workington Iron and Steel Company's parliamentary agent to the Board of Trade on 2 December 1912 stated "..the line is being used [...] for the purpose of conveying workmen between Harrington and the works of the Promoters..." A photograph taken of the first public train on 2 June 1913 shows it at the workmen's platform at Lowca, the public platform yet not being ready. They also give  as opening on 2 June 1913. This suggests that the workmen's service called at Moss Bay Cart Siding/Workington Central, Rose Hill Platform and Lowca Workmen's Platform. The mention of "...conveying workmen between Harrington and the works..." and entries in Croughton and Quick give tentative support to the Rose Hill Platform (a.k.a. Junction) call. Ex-employees writing later state "Miners' trains went up the private railway from Rosehill Box, where Pat McGuire, the "singing signalman" operated." Some later authors appear to conflate Rosehill Platform (a.k.a. Rose Hill Platform) and Archer St Halt.

A public passenger service passed the halt between 2 June 1913 and May 1926. This was in essence an "upgraded" workmen's train, composed of the ancient workmen's coaches with a "public" coach tacked on. No source records this stopping between Archer Street and Copperas Hill. It is possible that when the public service ended in May 1926, the unadvertised workmen's trains which carried on until 1929 could have resorted to calling at Rose Hill Platform instead of or as well as Archer Street. Further research is needed.

Freight services
The railway through the halt was first and foremost a mineral railway, with the short-lived workmen's and passenger services an afterthought. A waggonway had climbed Rose Hill itself in the first half of the nineteenth century, connecting Harrington harbour with John Pit and Hodgson Pit. Later developments eventually ran northwards towards Workington and northeastwards to meet the Gilgarran Branch at Bain's Siding. The driving forces were coal at Lowca, fireclay and bricks at Micklam (primarily aimed at lining furnaces at Workington's steelworks), coke and coking bi-products. Centrepiece for over fifty years was Harrington No. 10 Colliery which, confusingly, was not in Harrington, but in Lowca.

Between them these industrial concerns sustained the railway through the site of the halt until final closure to all traffic in May 1973.

A British record
The halt was ephemeral and short-lived, but the track immediately to its south has its place in the railway record books. Its southbound uphill gradient of 1 in 17 was the steepest adhesion-worked British incline carrying a regular, timetabled passenger service.

Afterlife
The track through the station site was lifted by the end of 1973. The trackbed now forms part of the Cumbrian Way.

See also
 Gilgarran Branch
 Cleator and Workington Junction Railway

References

Sources

Further reading

External links
 The closed station on an inter-war OS map, via National Library of Scotland
 Latterday steam at Lowca, via flickr
 Latterday steam at Lowca, via flickr
 Industrial relics at Lowca, via flickr
 The line, via railwaycodes
 The Harrington collieries, via Haig Pit Mining Museum

Disused railway stations in Cumbria
Railway stations in Great Britain opened in 1913
Railway stations in Great Britain closed in 1926
1913 establishments in England